Plaza Inter is a shopping center in Managua, Nicaragua, developed and operated by the Taiwanese company Nica Eastern Development, Inc. The shopping center is home to 65 stores, a food court, a supermarket and a movie theater.

History
The Plaza Inter shopping center is located next to the Hotel Crowne Plaza in Managua's old center. The mall, built and operated by a group of Taiwanese investors, started operations in 1998.

Plaza Inter has an open space on the second floor for concerts and fairs, called Plaza Maya.

Gallery

References

Shopping malls in Nicaragua